James Alfred Conrad Cammack Jr. (born April 15, 1956) is an American jazz bassist from Cornwall, New York.

Career
For nearly thirty years, he played bass for Ahmad Jamal. His debut solo album, Both Sides of the Coin, was released in 2012. Before joining Jamal in 1983, he played in U.S. Army bands. At the age of eighteen in 1974, he became a member of the West Point Army Band as a trumpeter, though he was learning bass. He played for the Jazz Knights and on weekends performed at resorts in the Catskill mountains of New York. For biggest influences on bass, he lists Israel Crosby, George Duvivier, and Milt Hinton.

Discography

With Ahmad Jamal
 Rossiter Road (Atlantic, 1986)
 Live at the Montreal Jazz Festival 1985 (Atlantic, 1986)
 Crystal (Atlantic, 1987)
 Pittsburgh (Atlantic, 1989)
 Live in Paris 1992 (Birdology, 1993)
 The Essence Part One (Verve, 1995)
 Big Byrd: The Essence Part 2 (Verve, 1997)
 Nature: The Essence Part Three (Atlantic, 1998)
 Picture Perfect (Birdology, 2000)
 A L'Olympia (Dreyfus, 2001)
 In Search of Momentum (Dreyfus, 2003)
 After Fajr (Dreyfus, 2005)
 It's Magic (Dreyfus, 2008)
 A Quiet Time (Dreyfus, 2009)
 Marseille (Jazz Village, 2017)
Ballades (Jazz Village, 2019)

With Malachi Thompson
Freebop Now! (Delmark, 1998)
Rising Daystar (Delmark, 1999)
With others
 Alexis Cole, Close Your Eyes (Venus, 2014)
 Larry Coryell, Montgomery (Patuxent, 2011)
 Mac Chrupcala, Bernard Purdie, One More for the Road (2013)
 Howard Johnson, Right Now! (Verve, 1997)
 Shahin Novrasli, Emanation (Jazz Village, 2017)
 Roberto Tarenzi, Jorge Rossy, Love and Other Simple Matters (Via Veneto, 2018)

References

1956 births
Living people
American double-bassists
Male double-bassists
United States Military Academy people
United States Army Band musicians
21st-century double-bassists
21st-century American male musicians